Tümendembereliin Sükhbaatar (born 1 March 1964) is a Mongolian wrestler. He competed in the men's freestyle 48 kg at the 1988 Summer Olympics.

References

1964 births
Living people
Mongolian male sport wrestlers
Olympic wrestlers of Mongolia
Wrestlers at the 1988 Summer Olympics
Place of birth missing (living people)